Puepahk Tugypahgyn Noomwevehchuh Psehdtuhneeyet (also known as Seasons of Our Story) is a 1993 glass and red sandstone sculpture by Janet Shapero, installed in Salt Lake City, Utah, United States.

Description and history
Installed in the Triad Center, the abstract work was commissioned during 1992–1993, copyrighted in 1993, and dedicated on June 21 of that year. The central stone measures approximately 12 x 8 x 4 feet, and the glass prisms each weigh 400 pounds and measure approximately 6 feet x 18 inches x 6 inches. The artwork was surveyed by the Smithsonian Institution's "Save Outdoor Sculpture!" program in 1994.

References

1993 sculptures
Glass works of art
Outdoor sculptures in Salt Lake City
Sandstone sculptures in the United States